Bear Rocks may refer to:
Bear Rocks, Pennsylvania, census-designated place in Pennsylvania, United States
Bear Rocks Preserve, wilderness area in West Virginia, United States